

See also 
 Connecticut's at-large congressional district special election, 1806
 United States House of Representatives elections, 1806 and 1807
 List of United States representatives from Connecticut

Notes 

1806
Connecticut
United States House of Representatives